Brendel is a surname. Notable people with the surname include:

 Alfred Brendel (born 1931), pianist
 Brian Brendell (born 1986), Namibian footballer
 El Brendel (1890–1964), American entertainer
 Daniela Brendel (born 1973), German swimmer
 Franz Brendel (1811–1868), 19th-century music critic and publisher
 Günther Brendel (born 1930), German painter
 Henry W. Brendel (1857–1940), American lawyer and government official
 Jake Brendel (born 1992), American football player
 Joachim Brendel (1921–1974), German Luftwaffe pilot
 Karl Brendel (1871–1925), German sculptor
 Martin Brendel (1862-1939), German astronomer
 Otto Brendel (1901–1973), scholar of Etruscan art
 Sarah Brendel, German pop singer
 Sebastian Brendel, German canoeist
 Wolfgang Brendel (born 1947), German opera singer